Auction Network is a 24-hour Internet and cable television channel that allows viewers to participate remotely in auctions taking place throughout the world.  Viewers become “virtual bidders” in live auctions of items, including automobiles, collectibles, million dollar thoroughbreds, art, wine collections, and sports and celebrity memorabilia, among other things, with a portion of proceeds occasionally being donated to charity.

The network launched October 28, 2007 as an Internet television network with streaming video, interactive bidding capability, Video On Demand and gaming content. The cable and satellite television platforms was launched in 2008.

Supported by the National Auctioneers Association (NAA), Auction Network is the first network dedicated entirely to the global auction industry.

References

External links
 
 

Television networks in the United States
Online auction websites of the United States